Maltisorb is a natural sweetening alcohol made by Roquette of France. It can be used in baking, especially in making fillings for cakes and cookies. It is available in a number of grades, labelled M59, M200 and M40. Maltisorb is a brand name for crystalline maltitol, the formula for which Roquette licenses from Towa Chemical Industry of Japan.

References

Sugar substitutes